SMSC may refer to:

 Seoul Metro (Seoul Metropolitan Subway Corporation)
 Shakopee Mdewakanton Sioux Community, a federally recognized tribe of Dakota people in Minnesota
 Short message service center
 Southwest Minnesota State College, now a university
 Spiritual, moral, social and cultural development, provided in schools through the National Curriculum for England.
 Standard Microsystems Corporation, a company acquired by Microchip Technology
 Smithsonian-Mason School of Conservation, a partnership between George Mason University and the Smithsonian Conservation Biology Institute